Parnas may refer to:

 Parnas (surname)
 Parnas fountain, a fountain in Brno, Czech Republic
 Parnas (Saint Petersburg Metro), a metro station in St. Petersburg, Russia
 People's Freedom Party (Russia) (PARNAS), an opposition political party in Russia
 Parnas Tower, a skyscraper in South Korea
 a synonym for gabbai or other synagogue functionary

See also
 
 Parnassos (municipality), a municipality in Greece
 Parnassus (disambiguation)
 Parna (disambiguation)
 Parnes (disambiguation)